Miguel Jiménez Ponce (born 14 March 1990), also known as Wacho, is a Mexican professional footballer who plays as a goalkeeper for Liga MX club Guadalajara.

Club career
Jiménez was brought up in the Club Deportivo Guadalajara youth system.

Loan at Coras
During the 2015 Liga MX Draft he was sent out on a six-month loan deal to Tepic to receive playing time. He made his professional debut with the club on 9 October 2015 in a match against Tapachula.

Guadalajara
Jiménez became the second choice goalkeeper in the Clausura 2017 season, and was the regular starter for Copa MX matches. On 19 April 2017, Guadalajara won the Clausura 2017 Copa MX after Jiménez stopped three consecutive penalties in the penalty shoot-out against Morelia. Jiménez made his official Liga MX debut as a starter against Club Léon on 18 November 2017. Jiménez started in the first leg of the CONCACAF Champions League final against Toronto FC on April 17, 2018, where his team went on to win the match 2–1.

Honours
Guadalajara
Liga MX: Clausura 2017
Copa MX: Clausura 2017
Supercopa MX: 2016
CONCACAF Champions League: 2018

References

External links
Miguel Jiménez Ponce at Ascenso MX

1990 births
Living people
Footballers from Nayarit
Mexican footballers
Association football goalkeepers
C.D. Guadalajara footballers
Tampico Madero F.C. footballers
Ascenso MX players
Liga MX players